The 1930 New Mexico Lobos football team represented the University of New Mexico as an independent during the 1930 college football season. In their 11th and final season under head coach Roy W. Johnson, the Lobos compiled a 4–5 record. Alfred Seery was the team captain. Tom Churchill was the assistant coach, and Jack McFarland was the freshman coach.

Johnson stepped down as football coach after the 1930 season, but he remained as the school's athletic director until 1949.

Schedule

References

New Mexico
New Mexico Lobos football seasons
New Mexico Lobos football